Halit Özgür Sarı (born 4 October 1993 is a Turkish actor and model.

Early life
Halit Özgür Sarı was born in 1993 in Istanbul. His grandfather is of Arab descent who immigrated from Aleppo. He graduated from the Istanbul Bilgi University, Department of Economics after graduating from high school. Halit modelled in his high school and college years and became the face of many brands. He further learnt acting from the Turkish actress Esra Kızıldoğan at the Basic and Advanced Acting Craft Studio during these years in front of the camera with the help of Enginay Kanat.

Career
In 2018, Sarı began his career in the TV series, Diriliş: Ertuğrul, broadcast on TRT 1 created by Mehmet Bozdağ, with the role of 'Süleyman Alp', son of Selcan Hatun. He also played the role of 'Klinik Müdürü Murat' in the TV series Kırmızı Oda broadcast on TV8. He is known for appearing in big projects in such a short period of time.

Personal life 
Sarı is a strict fan of the football club, Fenerbahçe and he also expressed that he had a dream of being an astronaut when he was little. He also says that he sleeps too much and only wakes up when he is told too but is never late for anything. He is followed by 1 million people on Instagram.

Filmography

References

External links

1993 births
Living people
1986 births
Turkish male television actors
21st-century Turkish male actors
Male actors from Istanbul
Turkish male models